Crush Crush is an incremental game and dating sim created by Canadian game developer Sad Panda Studios. The game was released on Kongregate as a browser game in early 2016, and in mid-2016 was released on Steam for Microsoft Windows, OS X and Linux. In late 2016 an adult version called Crush Crush: Moist and Uncensored was released on Nutaku as a browser game, with the adult version coming to Humble Bundle shortly thereafter. In 2019 Crush Crush was released on Google Play, in 2021 Crush Crush was released on the App Store, and in 2022, the game was released on the Nintendo Switch. 

The game features a number of characters that the protagonist can date and win over. The game also has spinoffs titles: Blush Blush, which is the male counterpart of Crush Crush released in 2019; Cabin Fever, a visual novel that focuses on Mallory, developed by Steamy Buns Games and released in 2021; and Hush Hush, which features characters from both Crush Crush and Blush Blush, released in 2022.

Crush Crush is live serviced, and continues to receive updates and new content from its developer. Over the years many large new features have been added, such as text messaging, limited time events, animated characters, voice overs and cross platform voting.

Gameplay
Crush Crush is an incremental game with a prestige mechanic. The player can earn reset boost which can be applied in a new play session to unlock faster speed. Crush Crush features a time slot mechanic which requires players to decide which jobs, hobbies, dates and events to run. In order to progress in the game the player must perform jobs to earn money, work on hobbies to unlock new jobs, and use money and their skills to level up each character's affection for the player. The requirements and time scales increase exponentially, requiring that the player take advantage of the prestige mechanic multiple times. As of October 2022, there are 49 unlockable characters you can interact with.

Reception
Crush Crush has received generally positive user reviews, with a 4.7/5 rating on Apple's App Store, a 4.6/5 rating on Google Play, a 90% rating on Steam and a 4.3/5 rating on Kongregate. PC Gamer said "There's a sea of hentai junk games on Steam, and then there's Crush Crush" in a 2021 article about Crush Crush. Gamesindustry.biz wrote that Sad Panda Studios is "Crush Crushing stereotypes" by providing "adult games about everyday people"

References

External links
 

2016 video games
Android (operating system) games
Browser games
Dating sims
Erotic video games
Incremental games
IOS games
Linux games
MacOS games
Video games developed in Canada
Windows games